The Drums of Jeopardy is a 1923 American silent mystery film directed by Edward Dillon, written by Arthur Hoerl and featuring Wallace Beery. It is based on the 1920 novel of the same name by Harold McGrath which was serialized in the Saturday Evening Post. The film was released by Tru-art Film Company in November 1923. The name of the villain in the story was originally called Boris Karlov, but when the actor Boris Karloff rose to prominence circa 1923, the character's name was changed to Gregor Karlov to avoid confusion. It was changed back to Boris again in the 1931 remake of the film which starred Warner Oland as the villain.

Producer M. H. Hoffman rose to prominence in Hollywood as a result of this film's success. He later became president of Tiffany Pictures, and founded Allied Pictures in 1931. Actress Elaine Hammerstein (the daughter of Arthur Hammerstein) also starred in the 1915 film version of The Moonstone, but her career declined after the end of the silent film era. She and her politician husband were killed in a car accident in Mexico in 1948.

Plot
As described in a film magazine review, Jerome Hawksley, confidential secretary to Grand Duke Alexis of Russia, is bequeathed upon the death of the Duke during the Russian Revolution two jewels known as the "Drums of Jeopardy." Because the jewels are of great value and believed to possess a supernatural power, Gregor Karlov attempts to secure them. The jewels are sent to the United States with a trusted friend and given to Banker Burrows for safekeeping. Gregor, in an attempt to steal the jewels, kills the banker and kidnaps Jerome. Dorothy Burrows teams with Cutty, a secret service man, and are determined to bring the culprit to justice. Gregor is traced to Little Russia, a café in New York City, and is killed during a fight. Jerome and Dorothy agree to marry and the jewels are returned to him.

Cast

Preservation
A copy of The Drums of Jeopardy is housed at the Library of Congress.

References

External links

Lobby card at Getty Images

1923 films
American silent feature films
American mystery films
American black-and-white films
Films based on American novels
Films based on horror novels
1923 mystery films
1920s English-language films
1920s American films
Silent mystery films
Silent horror films